Lakas means strength, power in Tagalog and may refer to:

 Lakas ng Bayan (English: People's Power), a political party in the Philippines
 Lakas–CMD, a political party in the Philippines founded in 2009
 Lakas–CMD (1991), a political party in the Philippines founded in 1991
 Demetrio B. Lakas (1925–1999), president of Panama
 Lakas Tama, studio album by comedian Vice Ganda

See also
Laka (disambiguation)
Lakka (disambiguation)